William Harold Hutchinson (25 April 1878 – 19 May 1965) was a British trade unionist and Labour Party activist.

Educated to secondary school level, Hutchinson became active in the Amalgamated Society of Engineers, and was first elected to its Executive Council in 1913.  The following year, he was also elected to the National Executive Committee of the Labour Party, becoming its chairman in 1920.  He stood for the party in Bolton at the 1924 general election, but was not successful.

Unusually for a trade union official, Hutchinson was a supporter of guild socialism, and was close to G. D. H. Cole and the Fabian Society.

In 1925, Hutchinson was elected to London County Council in Woolwich East, although he did not defend his seat at the following election.  From 1930 to 1933, he was President of the renamed Amalgamated Engineering Union, and he served the union until his retirement in 1943.  He then briefly worked as an organiser for the Industrial Orthopaedic Society, before retiring fully in 1946.

He died in Cardiff, aged 87.

References

1878 births
1965 deaths
British trade unionists
Labour Party (UK) councillors
Members of London County Council
Chairs of the Labour Party (UK)
Presidents of the Amalgamated Engineering Union